Enrico Melozzi (born, 22 June 1977), also known as Melox, is an Italian conductor, composer, arranger, cellist, and record producer.

Life and career 

Born in Teramo, as a child Melozzi learned to play the piano by himself and at the age of eight he composed his first pieces. After his diploma in cello, he graduated in composition at the London College of Music.

Melozzi's collaborations include Måneskin, Ana Mena, Giusy Ferreri, Pinguini Tattici Nucleari, Noemi, Achille Lauro, Rocco Hunt, Gianluca Grignani, Niccolò Fabi. He is a member of the electronic music duo Lisma Project together with DJ Stefano De Angelis and has also composed operas, chambre music, and musical scores for films and ballets.  He is the founder of the record label Cinik Records and in 2012 he co-founded with Giovanni Sollima the ensemble 100 Cellos and the Orchestra Notturna Clandestina.

References

External links  

 

1977 births  
Living people  
People from Teramo
Italian composers
Italian music arrangers 
Italian songwriters
Italian conductors (music)
Italian classical composers
Italian cellists
Alumni of the University of West London